Fogo is a 2012 Canadian-Mexican drama film directed by Yulene Olaizola. The film was screened in the Directors' Fortnight section at the 2012 Cannes Film Festival.

Cast
 Norman Foley
 Ron Broders
 Joseph Dwyer

References

External links
 

2012 films
2012 drama films
Canadian drama films
English-language Canadian films
English-language Mexican films
Films shot in Newfoundland and Labrador
Mexican drama films
2010s English-language films
2010s Canadian films
2010s Mexican films